Robert Dennis Crumb (born August 30, 1943) is an American cartoonist and musician who often signs his work R. Crumb.  His work displays a nostalgia for American folk culture of the late 19th and early 20th centuries, and satire of contemporary American culture.

Crumb is a prolific artist and contributed to many of the seminal works of the underground comix movement in the 1960s, including being a founder of the first successful underground comix publication, Zap Comix, contributing to all 16 issues. He was additionally contributing to the East Village Other and many other publications, including a variety of one-off and anthology comics. During this time, inspired by psychedelics and cartoons from the 1920s and 1930s, he introduced a wide variety of characters that became extremely popular, including countercultural icons Fritz the Cat and Mr. Natural, and the images from his Keep On Truckin' strip. Sexual themes abounded in all these projects, often shading into scatological and pornographic comics. In the mid-1970s, he contributed to the Arcade anthology; following the decline of the underground, he moved towards biographical and autobiographical subjects while refining his drawing style, a heavily crosshatched pen-and-ink style inspired by late 19th- and early 20th-century cartooning. Much of his work appeared in a magazine he founded, Weirdo (1981–1993), which was one of the most prominent publications of the alternative comics era. As his career progressed, his comic work became more autobiographical.

In 1991, Crumb was inducted into the comic book industry's Will Eisner Comic Book Hall of Fame. He was married to cartoonist Aline Kominsky-Crumb, with whom he frequently collaborated. Their daughter Sophie Crumb has also followed a cartooning career.

Early life (1943–1966)
Robert Crumb was born August 30, 1943, in Philadelphia to Catholic parents of English and Scottish descent, spending his early years in West Philadelphia and Upper Darby. His father, Charles Vincent Crumb, authored the book Training People Effectively. 

His mother, Beatrice Loretta Crumb ( Hall), was a housewife who reportedly abused diet pills and amphetamines. Crumb's parents' marriage was unhappy and the children were frequent witnesses to their parents' arguments.  The couple had four other children: sons Charles Vincent Crumb Jr. and Maxon Crumb, both of whom suffered from mental illness, and daughters Carol and Sandra. The family often moved between Philadelphia and Charles' hometown, Albert Lea, Minnesota. In August 1950, the Crumbs moved to Ames, Iowa. For two years, Charles, a Marine Corps sergeant, was an instructor in the Naval R.O.T.C. program at Iowa State College. The family moved to Milford, Delaware, when Crumb was twelve and where he was an average student whose teachers discouraged him from cartooning.

Inspired by Walt Kelly, Fleischer Brothers animation and others, Crumb and his brothers drew their own comics. His cartooning developed as his older brother Charles pushed him and provided feedback. In 1958 the brothers self-published three issues of Foo in imitation of Harvey Kurtzman's satirical Humbug and Mad which they sold door-to-door with little success, souring the young Crumb on the comic-book business. At fifteen, Crumb collected classical jazz and blues records from the 1920s to the 1940s. At age 16 he lost his Catholic faith.

Career

Early work (1962–1966)

Crumb's father gave him $40 when he left home after high school.  His first job, in 1962, was drawing novelty greeting cards for American Greetings in Cleveland, Ohio. He stayed with the company for four years, producing hundreds of cards for the company's Hi-Brow line; his superiors had him draw in a cuter style that was to leave a footprint on his work throughout his career.  

In Cleveland, he met a group of young bohemians such as Buzzy Linhart, Liz Johnston, and Harvey Pekar. Dissatisfied with greeting card work, he tried to sell cartoons to comic book companies, who showed little interest in his work.  In 1965, cartoonist Harvey Kurtzman printed some of Crumb's work in the humor magazine he edited, Help!.  Crumb moved to New York, intending to work with Kurtzman, but Help! ceased publication shortly after.  Crumb briefly illustrated bubblegum cards for Topps before returning to Cleveland and American Greetings.

Crumb married Dana Morgan in 1964.  Nearly destitute, the couple traveled in Europe, during which Crumb continued to produce work for Kurtzman and American Greetings, and Dana stole food.  The relationship was unstable as Crumb frequently went his own way, and he was not close to his son, Jesse (born in 1968).

In 1965 and 1966 Crumb had a number of Fritz the Cat strips published in the men's magazine Cavalier. Fritz had appeared in Crumb's work as early as the late 1950s; he was to become a hipster, scam artist, and bohemian until Crumb abandoned the character in 1969.

Crumb was becoming increasingly uncomfortable with his job and marriage when in June 1965 he began taking LSD, a psychedelic drug that was then still legal.  He had both good and bad trips.  One bad trip left him in a muddled state for half a year, during which for a time he left Dana; the state ended when the two took a strong dose of the drug together in April 1966. Crumb created a number of his best-known characters during his years of LSD use, including Mr. Natural, Angelfood McSpade, and the Snoid.

In January 1967 Crumb came across two friends in a bar who were about to leave for San Francisco; Crumb was interested in the work of San Francisco-based psychedelic poster artists, and on a whim asked if he could join them. There, he contributed upbeat LSD-inspired countercultural work to underground newspapers. The work was popular, and Crumb was flooded with requests, including to illustrate a full issue of Philadelphia's Yarrowstalks.

Independent publisher Don Donahue invited Crumb to make a comic book; Crumb drew up two issues of Zap Comix, and Donahue published the first in February 1968 under the publisher name Apex Novelties. Crumb had difficulty at first finding retailers who would stock it, and at first his wife took to selling the first run herself out of a baby carriage.

Crumb met cartoonist S. Clay Wilson, an art school graduate who saw himself as a rebel against middle-class American values and whose comics were violent and grotesque. Wilson's attitude inspired Crumb to give up the idea of the cartoonist-as-entertainer and to focus on comics as open, uncensored self-expression; in particular, his work soon became sexually explicit, as in the pornographic Snatch he and Wilson produced late in 1968.

The second issue of Zap appeared in June with contributions from Wilson and poster artists Victor Moscoso and Rick Griffin. Artist H.Fish also contributed to Zap. In December, Donahue published the still-unreleased issue as 0 and a new third issue with Gilbert Shelton joining the roster of regulars. Zap was financially successful, and developed a market for underground comix.

Crumb was a prolific cartoonist in the late 1960s and early 1970s; at his peak output he produced 320 pages over two years. He produced much of his best-known work then, including his Keep On Truckin' strip, and strips featuring characters such as the bohemian Fritz the Cat, spiritual guru Mr. Natural, and oversexed African-American stereotype Angelfood McSpade. During this period, he launched a series of solo titles, including Despair, Uneeda (published by Print Mint in 1969 and 1970 respectively), Big Ass Comics, R. Crumb's Comics and Stories, Motor City Comics (all published by Rip Off Press in 1969), Home Grown Funnies (Kitchen Sink Press, 1971) and Hytone Comix (Apex Novelties, 1971), in addition to founding the pornographic anthologies Jiz and Snatch (both Apex Novelties, 1969).

Crumb's work also appeared in Nasty Tales, a 1970s British underground comic. The publishers were acquitted in a celebrated 1972 obscenity trial at the Old Bailey in London; the first such case involving a comic. Giving evidence at the trial, one of the defendants said of Crumb: "He is the most outstanding, certainly the most interesting, artist to appear from the underground, and this (Dirty Dog) is Rabelaisian satire of a very high order. He is using coarseness quite deliberately in order to get across a view of social hypocrisy."

Weirdo (1980–1993)

While meditating in 1980, Crumb conceived of a magazine with a lowbrow aesthetic inspired by punk zines, Mad, and men's magazines of the 1940s and 1950s. From 1981 Crumb edited the first nine issues of the twenty-eight issue run of Weirdo, published by Last Gasp; his contributions and tastes determined the contents of the later issues as well, edited by Peter Bagge until 17, and Aline for the remainder of the run. The magazine featured cartoonists new and old, and had a mixed response. Crumb's fumetti was so unpopular that it has never appeared in Crumb collections.

Later life (1994–present)
The Crumbs moved into a house in southeastern France in 1991, which is said to have been financed by the sale of six Crumb sketchbooks. The  documentary Crumb, directed by Terry Zwigoff, appeared in 1994—a project on which Zwigoff had been working since 1985. The film won several major critical accolades.

From 1987 to 2005 Fantagraphics Books published the seventeen-volume Complete Crumb Comics and ten volumes of sketches.  Crumb (as "R. Crumb") contributes regularly to Mineshaft magazine, which, since 2009, has been serializing "Excerpts From R. Crumb's Dream Diary".

In 2009, after four years of work, Crumb produced The Book of Genesis, an unabridged illustrated graphic novel version of the biblical Book of Genesis. In 2016, the Seattle Museum of Art displayed the original drawings for The Book of Genesis as part of an exhibit entitled "Graphic Masters: Dürer, Rembrandt, Hogarth, Goya, Picasso, R. Crumb."

In January 2015, Crumb was asked to submit a cartoon to the left-wing magazine Libération as a tribute for the Charlie Hebdo shooting. He sent a drawing titled "A Cowardly Cartoonist", depicting an illustration of the backside of Crumb's friend Mohamid Bakshi, while referencing the prophet Muhammad, founder of Islam.

Professional collaborations
A friend of comic book writer Harvey Pekar, Crumb illustrated over 30 stories of Pekar's in the award-winning comic book series American Splendor, primarily in the first eight issues (1976–1983). As The Complete Crumb Comics co-editor Robert Fiore wrote about their collaborations:

Crumb collaborated with his wife, Aline Kominsky-Crumb, on many strips and comics, including Dirty Laundry Comics, Self-Loathing Comics, and work published in The New Yorker.

In 1978, Crumb allowed his artwork to be used as pictorial rubber stamp designs by Top Drawer Rubber Stamp Company, a collaboration between cartoonist Art Spiegelman, publisher Françoise Mouly, and people living at Quarry Hill Creative Center in Rochester, Vermont. R. Crumb's imagery proved to be some of the most popular designs produced by this avant-garde pictorial stamp company.

In the 1980s and 1990s, Crumb illustrated a number of writer Charles Bukowski's stories, including the collection The Captain Is Out to Lunch and the Sailors Have Taken Over the Ship and the story "Bring Me Your Love".

In 1984–1985 Crumb produced a series of illustrations for the tenth anniversary edition of Edward Abbey's environmental-themed novel The Monkey Wrench Gang, published in 1985 by Dream Garden Press of Salt Lake City. Many of these illustrations also appeared in a 1987 Monkey Wrench Gang calendar, and remain available on T-shirts.

R. Crumb Comix, a theatrical production based on his work and directed by Johnny Simons, was produced in Fort Worth, Texas, in 1986. It was revived at Duke University in 1990, and co-starred Avner Eisenberg. The development of the play was supervised by Crumb, who also served as set designer, drawing larger-than-life representations of some of his most famous characters all over the floors and walls of the set.

Crumb's collaboration with David Zane Mairowitz, the illustrated, part-comic biography and bibliography Introducing Kafka (1993), a.k.a. Kafka for Beginners, is one of his less sexual- and satire-oriented, comparably highbrow works. It is well-known and favorably received, and due to its popularity was republished as R. Crumb's Kafka.

Musical projects

Crumb has frequently drawn comics about his musical interests in blues, country, bluegrass, cajun, French Bal-musette, jazz, big band and swing music from the 1920s and 1930s, and they also heavily influenced the soundtrack choices for his bandmate Zwigoff's 1995 Crumb documentary.  In 2006, he prepared, compiled and illustrated the book R. Crumb's Heroes of Blues, Jazz & Country, with accompanying CD, which derived from three series of trading cards originally published in the 1980s.

Crumb was the leader of the band R. Crumb & His Cheap Suit Serenaders, for which he sang lead vocals, wrote several songs and played banjo and other instruments. Crumb often plays mandolin with Eden and John's East River String Band and has drawn four covers for them: 2009's Drunken Barrel House Blues, 2008's Some Cold Rainy Day, 2011's Be Kind To A Man When He's Down on which he plays mandolin, the latest (2022) "Goodbye Cruel World", on which he sings vocals, plays ukulele, mandolin & tiple.

With Dominique Cravic, in 1986 he founded "Les Primitifs du Futur"—a French band whose eclectic music has incorporated Bal-musette, folk, jazz, blues and world music—playing on their albums "Cocktail d'Amour" (1986), "Trop de Routes, Trop de Trains" (1995), "World Musette" (1999) and "Tribal Musette" (2008). He also provided the cover art for these albums.

Crumb has released CDs anthologizing old original performances gleaned from collectible 78-rpm phonograph records.  His That's What I Call Sweet Music was released in 1999 and Hot Women: Women Singers from the Torrid Regions in 2009.  Chimpin' the Blues, a collaboration with fellow record collector Jerry Zolten that combines rare recordings with conversation about the music and the musicians, was released in 2013. Crumb drew the cover art for these CDs as well.

In 2013, Crumb played mandolin with the Eden and John's East River String Band on their album Take A Look at That Baby and also took part in the accompanying music video.

Album covers

Crumb has illustrated many album covers, most prominently Cheap Thrills by Big Brother and the Holding Company and the compilation album The Music Never Stopped: Roots of the Grateful Dead.

Between 1974 and 1984, Crumb drew at least 17 album covers for Yazoo Records/Blue Goose Records, including those of the Cheap Suit Serenaders.  He also created the revised logo and record label designs of Blue Goose Records that were used from 1974 onward.

In 1992 and 1993, Robert Crumb was involved in a project by Dutch formation The Beau Hunks and provided the cover art for both their albums The Beau Hunks play the original Laurel & Hardy music 1 and 2. He also illustrated the albums' booklets.

In 2009, Crumb drew the artwork for a 10-CD anthology of French traditional music compiled by Guillaume Veillet for Frémeaux & Associés. The following year, he created three artworks for Christopher King's Aimer Et Perdre: To Love And To Lose: Songs, 1917–1934  and, in 2011, he once again played mandolin on an Eden and John's East River String Band album (Be Kind to a Man When He's Down) for which he also created the album cover artwork.

Style 
As told by Crumb in his biographical film, his artwork was very conventional and traditional in the beginning. His earlier work shows this more restrained style. In Crumb's own words, it was a lengthy drug trip on LSD that "left him fuzzy for two months" and led to him adopting the surrealistic, psychedelic style for which he has become known.

Crumb has been acclaimed for his attention to detail and satirical edge, but has also generated a significant amount of controversy for his graphic and very disturbing portrayals of sexuality and psychology. There exists a feminist backlash against his comics because they became more "violently misogynistic, as he graphically poured what were essentially his masturbatory fantasies onto the printed page.  Women were raped, dismembered, mutilated, and murdered, sometimes all at once."

A peer in the underground comics field, Victor Moscoso, commented about his first impression of Crumb's work, in the mid-1960s, before meeting Crumb in person: "I couldn't tell if it was an old man drawing young, or a young man drawing old." Robert Crumb's cartooning style has drawn on the work of cartoon artists from earlier generations, including Billy DeBeck (Barney Google), C. E. Brock (an old story book illustrator), Gene Ahern's comic strips, Basil Wolverton (Powerhouse Pepper), George Baker (Sad Sack), Ub Iwerks's characters for animation, Isadore Freleng's drawings for the early Merrie Melodies and Looney Tunes of the 1930s, Sidney Smith (The Gumps), Rube Goldberg, E. C. Segar (Popeye) and Bud Fisher (Mutt and Jeff). Crumb has cited Carl Barks, who illustrated Disney's "Donald Duck" comic books, and John Stanley (Little Lulu) as formative influences on his narrative approach, as well as Harvey Kurtzman of Mad Magazine fame.

Crumb has also cited his extensive LSD use as a factor that led him to develop his unique style.

After issues 0 and 1 of Zap, Crumb began working with others, of whom the first was S. Clay Wilson. Crumb said, about when he first saw Wilson's work "The content was something like I'd never seen before, ... a nightmare vision of hell-on-earth ..."  And "Suddenly my own work seemed insipid ..."

Crumb remains a prominent figure, as both artist and influence, within the alternative comics milieu.  He is hailed as a genius by such comic book talents as Jaime Hernandez, Daniel Clowes, and Chris Ware.  In the fall of 2008, the Institute of Contemporary Art in Philadelphia hosted a major exhibition of his work, which was favorably reviewed in The New York Times and in The Philadelphia Inquirer.

Recurring Crumb characters 
 Angelfood McSpade (1967–1971) – large-built black woman drawn as a racist African native caricature. She is usually depicted being sexually exploited or manipulated by men.
 BoBo Bolinski (1968–1972) – a "burr-headed barfly"
 Devil Girl (1987–1995) – Amazonian type who is the object of Mr. Natural's obsession in later comics; real name Cheryl Borck
 Eggs Ackley (1968–1971) – cheerful young egg salesman
 Flakey Foont (1967–2002) – Mr. Natural's neurotic disciple
 Fritz the Cat (1965–1972) – feline con artist who frequently went on wild adventures that sometimes included sexual escapades
 Honeybunch Kaminski (1970–1972) – a large-built teenage runaway and girlfriend of ProJunior
 Lenore Goldberg (1969–1970) – leader of the Girl Commandos, a group of young revolutionary women
 Mr. Natural (1967–2002) – unreliable holy man
 Shuman the Human (1969–1977) – another neurotic male character
 The Snoid (1967–1979) – diminutive sex fiend and irritating presence

Awards and honors

Crumb has received several accolades for his work, including the Inkpot Award in 1989, a nomination for the Harvey Special Award for Humor in 1990 and the Angoulême Grand Prix in 1999.

With Jack Kirby, Will Eisner, Harvey Kurtzman, Gary Panter, and Chris Ware, Crumb was among the artists honored in the exhibition "Masters of American Comics" at the Jewish Museum in New York City, from September 16, 2006, to January 28, 2007.

In 2017, Crumb's original cover art for the 1969 Fritz the Cat collection published by Ballantine sold at auction for $717,000, the highest sale price to that point for any piece of American cartoon art.

In the media 

In addition to numerous brief television reports, there are at least three television or theatrical documentaries dedicated to Crumb.

 Prior to the 1972 release of the film version of Fritz the Cat, Austrian journalist Georg Stefan Troller interviewed Crumb for a thirty-minute documentary entitled Comics und Katerideen on Crumb's life and artwhich he describes as "the epitome of contemporary white North America's popular art"as an episode of his Personenbeschreibung (literally "Person's description") documentary-format broadcast on the German TV network ZDF. The documentary also includes a "making-of" look at the then forthcoming Fritz movie, featuring production background interviews with Ralph Bakshi. By the mid-to-late 2000s, it could still be seen on rotation as part of the Personenbeschreibung series on the ZDF-owned digital specialty channel ZDFdokukanal (in 2009 replaced by the new channel ZDFneo).
 Arena: The Confessions of Robert Crumb (BBC Two, 13 February 1987)
 Crumb (1994), a documentary film by Terry Zwigoff

Crumb and his work is featured in Ron Mann's Comic Book Confidential (1988).

In the 2003 movie American Splendor, Crumb was portrayed by James Urbaniak. Crumb's wife Aline was quoted as saying she hated the interpretation and never would have married Robert if he was like that.

In 2006, Crumb brought legal action against Amazon.com after their Web site used a version of his widely recognizable "Keep On Truckin character.  The case was expected to be settled out of court.

Underground rap artist Aesop Rock mentions Crumb several times in his lyrics, including in the songs "Catacomb Kids" from the album None Shall Pass and "Nickel Plated Pockets" from his EP "Daylight".

R. Crumb's Sex Obsessions, a collection of his most personally revealing sexually oriented drawings and comic strips, was released by Taschen Publishing in November 2007.  In August 2011, following concerns about his safety, Crumb cancelled plans to visit the Graphic 2011 festival in Sydney, Australia, after a tabloid labeled him a "self-confessed sex pervert" in an article headlined "Cult genius or filthy weirdo?"

In 2012, Crumb appeared in John's Old Time Radio Show, talking about old music, sex, aliens and Bigfoot. He also played 78-rpm records from his record room in southern France. He has appeared on the show and recorded at least fourteen one-hour podcasts.

Personal life
Crumb has been married twice. He first married Dana Morgan in 1964, who gave birth to their son Jesse in 1968. Crumb met cartoonist Aline Kominsky in 1972; their relationship soon turned serious and they began living together (on the same property shared by Dana Crumb). In 1978, Crumb divorced Dana and married Aline, with whom Crumb has frequently collaborated. In September 1981 Aline gave birth to Crumb's second child, Sophie. Robert, Aline, and Sophie moved to a small village near Sauve in southern France in 1991. Dana died in 2014. Aline died in 2022.

At age six, Crumb's son was featured as a character in Robert and Aline's Dirty Laundry Comics #1 (Cartoonists Co-Op Press, 1974); he also appeared as an adult in Terry Zwigoff's 1994 documentary film, Crumb. On New Year's Eve, December 31, 2017, Crumb's son was seriously injured in a car accident near Phillipsville, California, and died three days later; he was 49 years old. 

Crumb was a member of the Church of the SubGenius.

Critical reception 
Crumb has frequently been the target of criticism due to his recurring themes of graphic sexual and violent abuse of women. Crumb himself has frequently admitted his insecurity and hostility in relation to women:

In addition to being the target of speculation by critical theorists and academic researchers, Crumb has also been held to scrutiny, by feminist writer Deirdre English. English has been quoted as saying that Crumb engages in "self-indulgent fantasies" through his work, continually blurring the line between entertainment and pornography.

He has been the target of criticism by colleagues as well, such as Trina Robbins, who called Crumb a "sexist pig" due to his sexual hostility towards women.

Crumb's work is also filled with unsavory images of African Americans (such as his recurring character Angelfood McSpade), who are often portrayed as indigent, tribal, and caricatured. Crumb often utilized African American characters as "tokens", appearing as re-used tropes such as clowns, tribesmen, athletes, etc. Researcher Edward Shannon interpreted the themes of Crumb's story containing marginalized Africans in "When the Niggers Take Over America" (published in 1993 in Weirdo) like this: "Crumb ... explores both the American Dream and its nightmare reflection; in this ... strip all-American white middle class children are depicted as cannibals eager to devour the devalued and dehumanized other." Crumb has responded to criticism by claiming that he did not invent racist caricature, but that they were part of the American culture in which he was raised. He sees his art as a criticism of the racist stereotype itself and assumed that the audience who read his work in the late 1960s were not racists and would understand his intentions.

Bibliography (selection)

Comics 
Zap Comix issues from 1 and 0 (1968) through at least 9 (1978) and several more (Apex Novelties, Print Mint, Last Gasp and other transient brand names, generally under Crumb's control, 1968–2016) – #0 and #1 are all drawn by Crumb, the rest have stories by others also
Snatch Comics issues 1–3 (Apex Novelties/Print Mint, late 1968 – Aug. 1969) – #1 by Crumb and S. Clay Wilson, the rest have stories by others also
R. Crumb's Fritz the Cat (Ballantine Books, New York, 1969) (no ISBN listed) – all Crumb; about half reprints
R. Crumb's Comics and Stories: April 1964 (Rip Off Press, 1969) –  all Crumb; single 10-pp. story about Fritz the Cat and incest (originally produced in 1964)
 Despair (Print Mint, 1969) — all Crumb
 Motor City Comics #1–2 (Rip Off Press, Apr. 1969 – Feb. 1970) – all Crumb
 Big Ass Comics #1–2 (Rip Off Press, June 1969 – Aug. 1971) – all Crumb
 Mr. Natural #1–3 (San Francisco Comic Book Company, Aug. 1970 – Kitchen Sink Enterprises, 1977) – all Crumb
 Uneeda Comix, "the Artistic Comic!" (Print Mint, Aug. 1970) – several short strips by Crumb. The longest, last and strongest continues onto the back cover in color.
 Home Grown Funnies (Kitchen Sink Enterprises, Jan. 1971) – all Crumb
 Your Hytone Comix (Apex Novelties, 1971) – all Crumb
 XYZ Comics (Kitchen Sink Press, June 1972) – all Crumb
The People's Comics (Golden Gate Publishing Company, Sept. 1972) – all Crumb. This contains the strip in which there is Crumb Land (a black void), and also the strip in which Fritz the Cat is killed.
Artistic Comics (Golden Gate Publishing Company, Mar. 1973) – all Crumb, with illustrations of (among others) Aline Kominsky
 Black and White Comics (Apex Novelties, June 1973) – all Crumb
 Dirty Laundry Comics #1–2 (Cartoonists Co-Op Press/Last Gasp, July 1974 – Dec. 1977) – R. Crumb and Aline Kominsky
Best Buy Comics (Apex Novelties, 1979) – R. Crumb and Aline Kominsky
Snoid Comics (Kitchen Sink Enterprises, 1980) – all Crumb
 Hup #1–4 (Last Gasp, 1987–1992) – all Crumb
 Id #1–3 (Fantagraphics, 1990–1991) – all Crumb
 Self-Loathing Comics (Fantagraphics, Feb. 1995 – May 1997) – R. Crumb and Aline Kominsky-Crumb
 Mystic Funnies #1–3 (Alex Wood, Last Gasp, Fantagraphics, 1997–2002) – all Crumb
Mineshaft #5–present (Dec. 2000 –)

Collections and graphic novels 
 R. Crumb's Head Comix (Viking Press, 1968) – anthology; re-issued by Fireside Books in 1988, with a new introduction by Crumb; 
 R. Crumb's The Yum Yum Book (Scrimshaw Press, 1975) – originally created in 1963; later republished as Big Yum Yum Book: The Story of Oggie and the Beanstalk by Snow Lion Graphics/SLG Books, 1995
 R. Crumb Sketchbook series (Zweitausendeins, 1981–1997) – later republished in 10 volumes by Fantagraphics
 Bible of Filth (Futuropolis, 1986) – collection of Crumb's erotic comics from over the years
 The Complete Crumb Comics (Fantagraphics Books, 1987–2005) – 17 volumes
 Introducing Kafka (Totem Books, 1993)  – with writer David Zane Mairowitz
 R. Crumb's America (SCB Distributors, 1995) 
 Crumb Family Comics (Last Gasp, 1998)  – collection of stories by each member of the Crumb family, including Aline Kominsky-Crumb, Charles Crumb, Maxon Crumb, and Sophie Crumb
 Bob and Harv's Comics (Running Press, 1996)  – collaborations with Harvey Pekar
The R. Crumb Coffee Table Art Book (Little, Brown and Company, 1997)  – edited and designed by Peter Poplaski
Odds & Ends (Bloomsbury Publishing UK, 2001) 
 The R. Crumb Handbook (2005). London: MQ Publications.  – edited and designed by Peter Poplaski
 R. Crumb's Heroes of Blues, Jazz & Country (Harry N. Abrams, 2006) 
 R. Crumb's Sex Obsessions (Taschen, 2007)
 Your Vigor for Life Appalls Me (Turnaround Publisher, 2008) 
 The Book of Genesis (W. W. Norton & Company, 2009)  
 The Book of Mr. Natural (Fantagraphics, 2010) 
 The Complete Record Cover Collection (W. W. Norton & Company, 2011) 
 The Sweeter Side of R. Crumb (W. W. Norton, 2011) 
 Drawn Together: The Collected Works of R. and A. Crumb (Boni & Liveright, 2012)  – R. Crumb and Aline Crumb
 The Weirdo Years: 1981–'93 (Last Gasp,  2013)

See also 

Charles Addams
John M. Crowther
Edward Gorey
Gary Larson
Lorin Morgan-Richards
Shel Silverstein
Marvin Townsend
Gahan Wilson
Crumb (film)

Notes

References

Works cited 

 

 

 

 Holm, D. K. (2004). R. Crumb: Conversations. Conversations With Comic Artists series. Jackson: University Press of Mississippi. 
 

 Huxley, David (2001). Nasty Tales: Sex, Drugs, Rock 'n' Roll and Violence in the British Underground. Vol. 2, Primal – Spinal Comix History Series. London: Critical Vision, p. 135. .
 Lopes, Paul (2009). Demanding Respect: The Evolution of the American Comic Book. Philadelphia, PA: Temple University Press, pp. 80–82. .

Further reading 
 Bukowski, Charles, writer; Crumb, R., illustrator (1998). The Captain Is Out to Lunch and the Sailors Have Taken Over the Ship
 Fabricant, M. Chris, writer; Crumb, R., illustrator (2005). Busted! Drug War Survival Skills
 Monggaard, Christian, writer; Crumb, R., illustrator (2020). I Can’t Do Pretty. A Portrait and Two Interviews. Barbar Bøger. ISBN 9788797165010.

Audio/Video
Robert Crumb interview:

External links 

 
 

1943 births
Living people
20th-century American artists
21st-century American artists
20th-century American novelists
21st-century American novelists
Album-cover and concert-poster artists
Alternative cartoonists
American expatriates in France
American graphic novelists
American people of English descent
American people of Scottish descent
American satirists
American SubGenii
American erotic artists
Artists from Philadelphia
Grand Prix de la ville d'Angoulême winners
Musicians from Philadelphia
Raw (magazine)
Will Eisner Award Hall of Fame inductees
Writers from Philadelphia
Underground artists
Underground cartoonists
Underground publishers
American male novelists
American Splendor artists
Obscenity controversies in comics
Race-related controversies in comics
Comedians from Pennsylvania
Novelists from Pennsylvania
21st-century American non-fiction writers
American male non-fiction writers
Freak scene
Writers who illustrated their own writing
Inkpot Award winners
20th-century American male writers
21st-century American male writers